Tue Madsen (born 1969) is a Danish music producer and sound engineer, who is well known in metal genre for his work with bands like Meshuggah, Dark Tranquillity, Suicide Silence, Hatesphere,   The Haunted, 
Mnemic, 
Ektomorf, Cataract, 
Exmortem,  
and Born from Pain. His first work as a producer was the album Embraced by the Absolute by Autumn Leaves in 1997. Madsen acts at his own studio called Antfarm Studios.

He played guitars for Danish metal band Grope after departure from his former band Pixie Killers.

Musician

Pixie Killers 
One Size Fits All (1993)

Grope 
Primates (1994)
Soul Pieces EP (1996)
The Fury (1996)
Desert Storm (1997)
Intercooler (1999)
If You Were My Dog (2002)

Albums produced

1997-2000 

Embraced by the Absolute by Autumn Leaves (1997)
Bones by Torn (1997)
Desert Storm by Grope (1997)
Repertoire by Luksus (1998)
Weight Watchers All Unite by Cinnamon Sigh (1999)
Out of the Ruins by Cosmonks (1999)
Full Contact by N.A.O.P. (1999)
In The Shallow Waters by 2 Ton Predator (1999)
Intercooler by Grope (1999)
Do You Think It's Safe by The Burning Primitive (2000)
Flowerish by Strömning (2000)

2001-2002 

Hard Words Softly Spoken by Jerkstore (2001)
Living Dead by Mevadio (2001)
Baby Gimme Love by The Defectors (2001)
Boogie by 2 Ton Predator (2001)
My Life My Rules by Freebase (2001)
Hardcore by Barcode (2001)
Flow by Villa (2002)
Pestilence Empire by Exmortem (2002)
If You Were My Dog by Grope (2002)
The Darkness of Apokalypse Has Fallen EP by As We Fight (2002)

2003 

Hotellet Brænder by Singvogel (2003)
Save Me a Prayer by One Bar Town (2003)
Demon Dealer by 2 Ton Predator (2003)
Hard to Deny by N.A.O.P. (2003)
Universal Struggle by Knuckldust (2003)
Samara by The Psyke Project (2003)
Room Service by Panzerchrist (2003)
Hands Down by Mevadio (2003)
Blunt by Blunt (2003)
Something Old, Something New, Something Borrowed and Something Black by Hatesphere (2003)
Sands of Time by Born from Pain (2003)
Mechanical Spin Phenomena by Mnemic (2003)

2004 

Call for Response by Gob Squad (2004)
Twilight Central Station by Strömning (2004)
Force the Pace by Withering Surface (2004)
Epileptic by In-Quest (2004)
Antigone by Heaven Shall Burn (2004)
Samurai by Die Apokalyptischen Reiter (2004)
Endorsed By Hate by Maroon (2004)
Eternal Cosmic Slaughter by Urkraft (2004)
Black Nails and Bloody Wrists by As We Fight (2004)
Damage Done by No Turning Back (2004)
With Triumph Comes Loss by Cataract (2004)
The Tracy Chapter by Destiny (2004)
Destroy by Ektomorf (2004)
The Audio Injected Soul by Mnemic (2004)
Revolver by The Haunted (2004)

2005-2006 

Apparatets Skygge by Singvogel (2005)
The Comatose Quandaries by In-Quest (2005)
Nihilistic Contentment by Exmortem (2005)
Daikini by The Psyke Project (2005)
Unbreakable by Knuckldust (2005)
66Sick by Disbelief (2005)
Instinct by Ektomorf (2005)
The Archaic Abattoir by Aborted (2005)
Down Low by Betzefer (2005)
Terminate Damnation by Becoming the Archetype (2005)
The Blueprint Dives by Extol (2005)
Hail Horror by Himsa (2006)
In the Arms of Devastation by Kataklysm (2006)
 Inquebrantable by Nueva Etica (2006)
Idolator by Blood Stain Child (2006)
What Hell Is About by Dagoba (2006)
Radiovenom by 20 Inch Burial (2006)
Lust Stained Despair by Poisonblack (2006)
The Inhuman Aberration by Urkraft (2006)
Kingdom by Cataract (2006)
Doktorens Dosis by Singvogel (2006)
War by Born from Pain (2006)
Outcast by Ektomorf (2006)
Death to Tyrants by Sick of It All (2006)
The Dead Eye by The Haunted (2006)

2007-2009 
Fiction by Dark Tranquility (2007)
The Game of Fear by Eyeless (2007)
Slaughter and Apparatus by Aborted (2007)
Apnea by The Psyke Project (2007)
Under Satanæ by Moonspell (2007)
Passenger by Mnemic (2007)
Messengers by August Burns Red (2007)
Mozaiq by Blood Stain Child (2007)
Summon in Thunder by Himsa (2007)
The Cleansing by Suicide Silence (2007)
Allegory by Divinity (2007)
From The Gutter To Your Ears by Slow Death Factory  (2008)
Iconoclast (Part 1: The Final Resistance) by Heaven Shall Burn (2008)
Fresh Kill Daily by Mevadio (2008)
Cataract by Cataract (2008)
The God Of All Mistakes by Eminence (2008)
Night Eternal by Moonspell (2008)
Face The Colossus by Dagoba (2008)
Versus by The Haunted (2008)
VII by Amatory (2008)
On The Wings of Hope by Anime Fire (2009)

2010 
Based on a True Story by Sick of It All
We Are the Void by Dark Tranquillity
Sons of the System by Mnemic
Beyond Insanity by Beyond Insanity (unreleased/RIP)
Invictus (Iconoclast III) by Heaven Shall Burn
Heaven's Venom by Kataklysm
Инстинкт Обреченных (Instinct of the Doomed) by Amatory
Forging the Eclipse by Neaera
Session #2 by Soziedad Alkoholika (Producer/Master/Mixer)

2011 

Unseen by The Haunted 
Retornos by Asunto
DUM SPIRO SPERO by Dir en grey (Master/Engineer)
Prisoners by The Agonist (Mixing/Engineer)
Cadenas de Odio by Soziedad Alkoholika (Producer/Master/Engineer)
Imperios Por Derrumba by Dar Sangre (Mastering)
Suut Ki´in (album) by  MULUC PAX (Mastering)
 Perfection by Cold Snap (Croatia)

2012 
UROBOROS Remastered & Expanded by Dir en grey (Master)
 The Acoustic by Ektomorf
 The Beginning by ONE OK ROCK
 I Am by Becoming the Archetype
 Mnemesis by Mnemic
 Alpha Noir/Omega White by Moonspell
 It's Been so long by Slaveatgod
 Owls And Snakes by BatAAr
 Rinkaku by Dir en grey
 Temporality by Diamond Drive (Mastering)

2013 

 Ours Is the Storm by Neaera
 The Unraveling by Dir En Grey
 Veto by Heaven Shall Burn
 The Constant Fear by Dischord (Venezuela) (Mixing and mastering)
 World War 3 by Cold Snap (Croatia) (Production, recording, mixing and mastering)
 The Distance by BatAAr (mixing and mastering)
 The Stalker by Eminence (Brazil) (Production, recording, and mixing)

2014 

 Arche by Dir en grey
 Lessons In Futility by Arkarion
 Redefined Mayhem by Holy Moses
 Exit Wounds by The Haunted
 The Last Act of Defiance by Sick of It All
 The Artifact by Deceptic
 SLK by Stam1na (mixing and mastering)

2015 

 VITIUM by sukekiyo
 The Final Cull by One Machine
 SERPENTIGER by The Temple
 Horseflesh BBQ by Proll Guns

2016 
 SNAP (EP) by Royal Deceit
 Wanderer by Heaven Shall Burn
 The Violent Sleep of Reason by Meshuggah
 The Rotten Brood by Desire for Sorrow
 GRAVITAS by BatAAr (mixing and mastering)

2017 
 1755 by Moonspell

2018 
 Trinity by Omega Diatribe
 All Our Sins by Cold Snap
 The Last Dream by Fantasy Opus

2020 
 Of Truth and Sacrifice by Heaven Shall Burn
 Verminous by The Black Dahlia Murder (mixing)

References

External links 

Tue Madsen on Myspace

Danish record producers
1969 births
Living people
Danish audio engineers